Venus, known as Venus the Two-Faced Cat (born July 6, 2009), is an American tortoiseshell cat whose face  is half black and half red tabby. In addition, her eyes are heterochromic, her right eye being green, her left blue. Her social media accounts use the tagline "0% photoshopped, 100% born this way!".

Venus was adopted as a stray in September 2009 by a couple in North Carolina who have four other pets, cats Tater Tot, Roo and Ginger, and dog Halo. She became famous after a Reddit post in August 2012. she had more than a million views on YouTube; she had 673,000 Instagram followers and almost a million "likes" on Facebook. She appeared on The Today Show in August 2012 and on Fox & Friends in July 2014. 

Venus has been described by veterinarians as a chimera, but her markings may alternatively be a matter of luck, an unusual expression of mosaicism. She also has different-colored eyes: the blue eye on the ginger side of her face suggests the latter, since it is presumably caused by the piebald gene that also produced her white paws and white spots on her chest.

See also
 List of individual cats

References

External links 
 Venus the Two Face Cat on Facebook

2006 animal births
Animals on the Internet
Individual cats in the United States
Internet memes about cats